This is the list of number-one tracks on the ARIA Club Chart in 2020, and is compiled by the Australian Recording Industry Association (ARIA) from weekly DJ reports.

2020

Number-one artists

See also
ARIA Charts
2020 in music

References

Number-one singles
Australia Club Chart
2020 Club